Gaylen Ross (born August 15, 1950) is an American director, writer, producer and actress, best known for playing Francine Parker in the 1978 horror film Dawn of the Dead and also noted for directing the 2008 documentary Killing Kasztner.

Background
Ross was born and raised in Indianapolis, Indiana, where she graduated from Broad Ripple High School in 1967. She studied at Monterey Peninsula College in California, and later received her BA from The New School for Social Research in Literature.  She was managing editor of the poetry journal, Antaeus and Ecco Press from 1975 to 1977.

Ross holds citizenship in the United States and Israel. In 2015, she was named to the Indianapolis Public School Education Foundation’s Hall of Fame.

Career

Ross's documentary films include 2008's Killing Kasztner and Dealers Among Dealers, a documentary of New York’s 47th Street diamond trade.  Ross's company, GR Films, has produced Listen To Her Heart: The Life and Music of Laurie Beechman; Not Just Las Vegas, about the rise of nationwide gambling in the USA; To Russia For Love, about the Russian Mail-order bride business; Selling The Dream: Stock Hype and Fraud; Dealers Among Dealers and the Emmy Award-winning Blood Money: Switzerland's Nazi Gold. Ross, along with John Connolly co-authored Married To A Stranger, about the Russian mail order bride business, published by Berkeley Publishing Group.

In 2009, Ross released Killing Kasztner on the life and assassination of Rezso Kasztner. She commented in an interview with Aviva Berlin:The film is very personal, very emotional in the portrayal of the families and survivors, and they were terribly candid and open in their view of what had happened to them over the years, and the effects of the trial and murder on their lives. Especially Kasztner´s daughter Zsuzsi. And because the film shows the other side, significantly the murderer´s revelations and personal history, and other detractors of Kasztner, I understood how sensitive and potentially upsetting the film could be. What was gratifying was to see how the audience respected the balance and understood, I believe, that I tried to show everyone in the film, pro or con Kasztner, with dignity and to allow their voices to be heard. I didn´t always agree with some of the positions taken, but I tried to have their opinions represented.When asked why it is still so difficult to talk about Kasztner even half a century later, Ross commented in her interview with FF2 Media's Jan Huttner:I'm trying to separate the truth about Kasztner (and what Kasztner tried to do) from the rumors, falsehoods, misinformation, and politics. I was not there, but I've certainly read and looked at the newest research that has evolved over five decades. Archives have been opened, and new interpretations are now being given to the Hungarian Holocaust. This information was not available to Judge Benjamin Halevi during the original trial in Israel; not available to Ben Hecht; not available to the world then.Ross' other films include  Dealers Among Dealers (1995) Ross wrote Blood Money: Switzerland’s Nazi Gold (1997), co-produced with Stephen Crisman; After Solidarity: Three Polish Families in America and Caris' Peace, which documents film and stage actress Caris Corfman. Other films and television projects have focused on bank fraud, gambling in America, and Russian mail-order brides. She has directed productions for “The Jewish Foundation for the Righteous" and the "UJA Federations of North America."

Ross starred as "Francine" in George A. Romero's 1978 horror film Dawn of the Dead, followed by her portrayal of "Betsy" in the 1981 slasher film Madman then as Leslie Nielsen's adulterous wife "Becky Vickers" in George Romero and Stephen King's 1982 film Creepshow.

Current projects include professional boxing documentary TitleShot.  With co-director Andy Cohen, projects in post-production include films on the Village Gate, and human rights activists. Ross is collaborating with Cohen on Beijing Spring, a documentary about artistic freedom and the democracy movement between 1978 and 1982 in China.

Ross and Cohen directed the 2019 documentary Ximei, produced by Ai Weiwei. The film premiered at the International Film Festival and Forum on Human Rights in Geneva.

Filmography
As a director:
 Out of Solidarity (1989)
 Time for Art (1990)
 Not Just Las Vegas (1994)
 Dealers Among Dealers (1996)
 To Russia for Love: Mail-Order Brides (1999)
 Listen to Her Heart: The Life and Music of Laurie Beeckman (2003)
 Killing Kasztner (2008)
 Caris' Peace (2011)
  TitleShot (2019)
 Ximei (2019)
 Beijing Spring (2020)

As an actress:

 Dawn of the Dead (1978)
 Madman (1982)
   Creepshow (1982)

References

External links

 GR Films Inc

1950 births
American film actresses
American film directors
Jewish American actresses
Living people
Jewish American writers
American women film producers
Monterey Peninsula College alumni
21st-century American Jews
21st-century American women